Queenslandolaelaps is a genus of mites in the family Ologamasidae. There are at least two described species in Queenslandolaelaps.

Species
These two species belong to the genus Queenslandolaelaps:
 Queenslandolaelaps berlesei Womersley, 1956
 Queenslandolaelaps vitzthumi Womersley, 1956

References

Ologamasidae